Tuxtepec District is located in the north of the Papaloapan Region of the State of Oaxaca, Mexico.

Municipalities

The district includes the following municipalities:
 
Acatlán de Pérez Figueroa
Ayotzintepec
Cosolapa
Loma Bonita
San Felipe Jalapa de Díaz
San Felipe Usila
San José Chiltepec
San José Independencia
San Juan Bautista Tuxtepec
San Juan Bautista Valle Nacional
San Lucas Ojitlán
San Miguel Soyaltepec
San Pedro Ixcatlán
Santa María Jacatepec

References

Districts of Oaxaca
Papaloapan Region